The 2023 Major League Rugby season is the sixth season of Major League Rugby, the professional rugby union competition sanctioned by USA Rugby. The regular season began on February 17, 2023.

The Chicago Hounds made their debut this season, while the Austin Gilgronis and LA Giltinis withdrew from the competition. This leaves a total of 12 teams competing; 6 teams in each conference, with the Chicago Hounds being added to the Western Conference.

Teams and format 
The 12 teams will contest the regular season, with 6 in each of the Eastern and Western Conferences. Each club will play two games against each of the other five clubs in their conference (one at home and one away each,) and one game against each of the six clubs in the other conference.

Conference rankings at the end of the regular season will determine each team's placement in the post season, known as the Championship Series:
 Teams ranked 2nd in their conference will host the team ranked 3rd, as part of the Eliminators. 
 The team in the conference ranked 1st will receive a bye, and host the winner of their conference's Eliminator, to determine the Conference Champion.
 Both Conference Champions will then contest the Championship Final, which will be hosted by the Conference Champion that ranked the highest in the regular season. The winners of the Championship Final will lift the MLR Shield, and become the 2023 Major League Rugby Champions. On March 16, it was announced by the league that the Championship Final would be held at SeatGeek Stadium in Chicago, on July 8, 2023.

Regular season
The regular season consists of 18 weeks, with each team playing 16 matches, beginning on February 17, 2023 and ending on June 18.

Standings

Matches
The following are the match results for the 2023 Major League Rugby regular season:

Updated to match(es) played on March 19, 2023 
Colors: Blue: home team win; Yellow: draw; Red: away team win.

Scheduled matches

Week 1 (February 17–19)

Week 2 (February 24–26)

Week 3 (March 3–5)

Week 4 (March 11–12)

Week 5 (March 18–19)

Week 6 (March 25–26)

Week 7 (March 31–April 2)

Week 8 (April 8)

Week 9 (April 15–16)

Week 10 (April 22–23)

Week 11 (April 28–30)

Week 12 (May 6–7)

Week 13 (May 12–14)

Week 14 (May 18–21)

Week 15 (May 27–28)

Week 16 (June 2–4)

Week 17 (June 9–11)

Week 18 (June 17–18)

Championship Series

Eliminators (June 24–25)

Conference Finals (July 1–2)

Championship final (July 8)

Player statistics

Top scorers
The top ten try and point scorers during the 2023 Major League Rugby season are:

Last updated: March 14, 2023

Sanctions

Last updated:  March 15, 2023

Notes

References

Major League Rugby seasons
Major League Rugby
Major League Rugby
Major League Rugby
Major League Rugby